The 120th Airlift Wing (120 AW) is a unit of the Montana Air National Guard, stationed at Great Falls Air National Guard Base at Great Falls International Airport, Montana. If activated to federal service, the Wing is gained by the United States Air Force Air Mobility Command.

Mission
The 120th Airlift Wing, as part of the Montana Air National Guard, serves a dual mission:

 They are both full-time components of the Air Expeditionary Forces mission which participates in the defense of the United States.
They are also on call for use by the state Governor to use in case of natural disasters to augment state declared emergencies.

Units
The 120th Airlift Wing consists of the following units:
 120th Operations Group
 186th Airlift Squadron
 120th Mission Support Group
 120th Maintenance Group
 120th Medical Group

History
On 1 July 1955, the Montana Air National Guard 186th Fighter-Interceptor Squadron was authorized to expand to a group level, and the 120th Fighter Group (Air Defense) was established by the National Guard Bureau. The 186th FIS becoming the group's flying squadron. Other squadrons assigned into the group were the 120th Headquarters, 120th Material Squadron (Maintenance), 120th Combat Support Squadron, and the 120th USAF Dispensary. The group was gained by the 29th Air Division, Air Defense Command with a mission for the air defense of the northern tier of the United States. The Group Commander, Col. Rodger D. Young was promoted to Brig. General in 1966 and became Chief of Staff of Air for the 120th until his retirement in 1973.

In 1958, the 120th implemented the ADC Runway Alert Program, in which interceptors of the 186th FIS were committed to a five-minute runway alert, a task that would last for 38 years. The arrival of the F-102 Delta Dagger in 1966 ushered in the supersonic age. In 1968 Air Defense Command was re-designated as Aerospace Defense Command (ADCOM). In 1972, the unit was redesignated the 120th Fighter-Interceptor Group and assigned the F-106 Delta Dart, the first Air National Guard unit to receive this aircraft. With the F-106, the squadron competed in and won its first William Tell, a live-fire missile competition held at Tyndall AFB, Florida.   Performed air defense duties along the northern tier of the United States until 1978 when ADCOM was merged into Tactical Air Command. Continued air defense mission for ADTAC component of TAC with the F-106s, transferring to First Air Force when ADTAC was replaced in 1985.

The 186th FS converted from the F-106A to the F-16A/B Fighting Falcon in mid-1987. The conversion happened earlier than was scheduled and the 186th FIS was to be the last squadron to lose its F-106s. The first aircraft were older block 5 and 10 models with some block 15 airframes also being delivered to the squadron. Main task for the unit was air defense, as with many ANG units who were equipped with the F-16. In 1991 the F-16s were brought up to the Air Defense Fighter (ADF) variant. This meant a serious leap in performance and capability of this squadron in their defensive role. This situation was maintained up until 2001 when the squadron started receiving more modern F-16C block 30 aircraft with larger intakes. This conversion replaced the air defense mission with one of general purpose/air-to-ground as part of the Expeditionary Aerospace Force.

With the conversion, unit members felt it was time to consider a change in the aircraft tail markings. The most notable change included the 186th Fighter Squadron's nickname of "Vigilantes". The nickname by the pilots of the 186th is intended to honor the first men in the Montana Territory who organized for the safety and welfare of the people.

The squadron once again found itself on alert status after the terrorism attacks in New York City and Washington, D.C. Base personnel implemented the necessary procedures to establish a secure environment while maintaining a 24-hour alert status for aircraft. During 2002, hundreds of unit personnel were activated and deployed to multiple locations in support of Operation Enduring Freedom and the world.

As a result of the 2005 BRAC decisions the unit converted to the F-15C/D during 2008 and revert to an all-air defense unit. In early December 2007 the first F-16 left Great Falls being transferred to the 158th Fighter Wing, Vermont ANG. By the summer of 2008, eighteen F-15C Eagles had been transferred from the 131st Fighter Wing at St. Louis due to its conversion to the 131st Bomb Wing, flying the B-2 stealth bomber.

Beginning in the summer of 2013, the Wing began the process of transferring its F-15C aircraft to the 144th Fighter Wing of the California Air National Guard. The final F-15 aircraft departed Great Falls on 24 October 2013. The 120th received their first C-130H from the 19th Airlift Wing on 1 March 2014

Lineage
 Designated 120th Fighter Group (Air Defense), and allotted to Montana ANG, 1955
 Extended federal recognition and activated, 1 July 1955
 Re-designated: 120th Fighter-Interceptor Group, 1 July 1972
 Re-designated: 120th Fighter Group, 15 Mar 1992
 Status changed from Group to Wing, 1 October 1995
 Re-designated: 120th Fighter Wing, 1 October 1995
 Re-designated: 120th Airlift Wing, 1 March 2014

Assignments
 140th Air Defense Wing, 1 July 1955
 Montana Air National Guard, 1 January 1961
 Gained by: Great Falls Air Defense Sector, Air Defense Command
 Gained by: 28th Air Division, Air Defense Command, 1 April 1966
 Gained by: 24th Air Division, Aerospace Defense Command, 1 January 1970
 Gained by: Air Defense, Tactical Air Command (ADTAC), 1 October 1979
 Gained by: First Air Force, Tactical Air Command, 9 December 1985
 Gained by: Northwest Air Defense Sector (NWADS), 1 July 1987
 Gained by: Western Air Defense Sector (WADS), 1 October 1997
 Jointly Gained by: Air Combat Command, 1 September 2001
 Jointly Gained by: Air Mobility Command, 1 March 2014

Components
 120th Operations Group, 1 October 1995 – Present
 186th Fighter-Interceptor (later Fighter) Squadron, 1 July 1955 – 1 October 1995
 Assigned to 120 OG effective 1 October 1995

Stations
 Great Falls International Airport, Montana, 1 July 1955
 Designated: Great Falls Air National Guard Base, Montana, 1991 – present
 Detachment 1 operated from Davis-Monthan AFB, Arizona (undetermined dates)

Aircraft

 F-94A Starfire, 1955–1956
 F-89C Scorpion, 1956–1958
 F-89H Scorpion, 1958–1960
 F-89J Scorpion, 1960–1966
 F-102 Delta Dagger, 1966–1972

 F-106 Delta Dart, 1972–1987
 Block 15 F-16A ADF Fighting Falcon, 1987–2001
 Block 30 F-16C Fighting Falcon, 2001–2008
 F-15C Eagle, 2008–2014
 C-130H Hercules, 2014 – present

References

 Rogers, B. (2006). United States Air Force Unit Designations Since 1978. 
 History of the 120th Fighter Wing
  Cornett, Lloyd H. and Johnson, Mildred W., A Handbook of Aerospace Defense Organization  1946  – 1980, Office of History, Aerospace Defense Center, Peterson AFB, CO (1980).
 120th Fighter Wing@globalsecurity.org

External links

 120th Fighter Wing Official Homepage

Wings of the United States Air National Guard
0120
Military units and formations in Montana